Kim Verson (born 2 September 1993) is a female Croatian singer known for being the winner of the second season of the TV show Hrvatska traži zvijezdu in 2010.

She released her first album Vjeruj u snove in September 2010 on Dallas Records. The biggest hits are "Ponovno rođena" and "Nevidljivo blago". Her second album, Vrati mi moj svijet, was released in 2018.

Discography
 Vjeruj u snove (2010)
 Vrati mi moj svijet (2018)

References

External links

1993 births
Croatian pop singers
21st-century Croatian women singers
Croatian songwriters
People from Nova Gradiška
Living people
Idols (TV series) winners